Maa or MAA may refer to:

People
 MAA (singer), Japanese pop singer, previously known as Mar from the band Marbell
Maa Afia Konadu (1950–2019), Ghanaian media personality

Organizations
 Mathematical Association of America, a professional society that focuses on mathematics
 Medieval Academy of America, a US organization in the field of medieval studies
 Montreal AAA, a Canadian athletic association
 Moot Alumni Association, the alumni association of the Willem C. Vis International Commercial Arbitration Moot
 Manufacturer's Aircraft Association, a 1917 US aerospace committee
 Military Aviation Authority, part of the UK Ministry of Defence responsible for regulating air safety across Defence
 Maryland Aviation Administration, a state agency of Maryland and an airport authority under the jurisdiction of the Maryland Department of Transportation
 Microcomputer Applications Associates, a predecessor to Gary Kildall's Digital Research

Culture
 Maa (1998 album), by Sagarika
 Maa (2007 album), by Rajaton
 Maa (2019 album), by Zubeen Garg
 Maa (1952 film), Bollywood film directed by Bimal Roy
 Maa (1959 film), Oriya film directed by Nitai Palit
 Maa (1976 film), Bollywood film directed by M.A. Thirumugham
 Maa (1991 film), Bollywood film starring Jeetendra and Jaya Pradha
 Maa, 1992 Bengali film directed by Prashanta Nanda
 Maa, 1991 ballet music by Kaija Saariaho
 Maa (novel), a novel by Anisul Hoque
 Maa (drama serial), a Bengali television serial
 MAA TV, a Telugu-language television channel based in Hyderabad, India
 Maa (newspaper), Estonian newspaper

Other
 Maa-Palaeokastro, promontory and Late Bronze Age archaeological site on west coast of Cyprus
 Maa languages, a group of closely related languages (or dialects) spoken in Tanzania and Kenya
 Maa language, or Maasai
 Master-at-arms, a type of security or training personnel
 Magma Arizona Railroad, the reporting mark of Magma Arizona Railroad
 Maastricht Aachen Airport, Netherlands (IATA airport code MST)
 Chennai International Airport, Meenambakkam, India (IATA airport code MAA)
 Marketing Authorization Application, an application (to a regulatory authority) to market a new drug
 Maximum Availability Architecture (Oracle MAA) for Oracle databases
 Methacrylic acid, a low-molecular-weight carboxylic acid
 Message Authenticator Algorithm, an early cryptographic function
 Microcomputer Applications Associates, a precursor of Gary Kildall's (Intergalactic) Digital Research, Inc. in the 1970s
 Multi-area agreement, a grouping of local-body areas in the United Kingdom
 Measurement assisted assembly, any method of assembly in which measurements are used to guide assembly processes
 Technetium (99mTc) albumin aggregated (99mTc-MAA), a radiopharmaceutical used for nuclear medicine lung imaging
 Mid-America Apartment Communities, US real estate investment trust